Joshua Bonehill-Paine (born 7 December 1992, also known as Joshua Bonehill) is an English far-right nationalist, internet troll, and convicted criminal from Yeovil, Somerset. Styling himself as a "nationalist, fascist, theorist and supporter of white rights", he ran a blog called The Daily Bale ("Britons Against Left-wing Extremism") which published several racist and anti-immigration hoaxes, as well as false accusations against his opponents. He has described himself as "a proud anti-semite".

Bonehill-Paine's online activity has led to criminal charges being brought against him for harassment, antisemitic commentary and hoaxing, including a 2013 online hoax that led to the owners of a Leicester pub receiving death threats, and other false accusations, for which he received a suspended prison sentence. He was described as an "internet troll" by the prosecutor at a 2014 court hearing. He was arrested in June 2015 for inciting racial hatred against Jews, for which he was found guilty in December, receiving a jail sentence of three years and four months. In 2016, he was sentenced to two years in prison for racially-aggravated harassment to be served in addition to his first sentence, and was serving his sentence at HM Prison Wayland.

Early activities
A former public schoolboy and briefly a Conservative Party member, Bonehill-Paine was sentenced to a 12-month community order with 100 hours' unpaid work and supervision by the probation service, following an incident on 11 March 2011 in which he broke into and burgled a police station in Chard, Somerset, using his Conservative Party membership card, while drunk. He was discovered by a constable outside the station in the early hours wearing a police uniform, and noted their poor security. He resisted efforts to arrest him, assaulting two officers in the process, and was found guilty of the offences of burglary, assault and criminal damage, also pleading guilty to criminal damage committed on 30 March to a flower bed in Yeovil.

In 2013, Bonehill-Paine announced plans to lead a "Stand Strong" march in Woolwich, a month after the murder of Lee Rigby, describing it as a protest against "extremism, terrorism and oppression".

In February 2014, Bonehill-Paine appeared in court in Yeovil on charges of malicious communications on Facebook, relating to comments regarding the UK Independence Party leader Nigel Farage, in October the previous year. That September, Bonehill-Paine announced that he was in the process of registering a political party in Yeovil, called the National British Resistance party. He described it as having "ambitions to replace the British National Party (BNP) and gain mainstream support", with the intention of contesting elections in 2015. Also that year, he released a video of himself speaking at a BNP meeting, delivering a call to "rise up and stand up as one white race united" to a small group of people in a pub. By 2015, he was reportedly a member of National Action.

Criminal acts

Malicious claims on blog
Bonehill-Paine's blog, The Daily Bale, ran hoax stories which were repeated as fact on social media. A story from The Daily Bale went viral in August 2013, falsely reporting that The Globe pub in Leicester had refused to admit members of the armed forces, so as not to offend immigrants. People who had read the story threatened the pub with arson and its staff with murder. Bonehill-Paine stated in an interview that his intention was to create "a shocking campaign" that people would "share quickly on social media". Security expert Graham Cluley called the stunt "utterly irresponsible and frankly moronic". In April 2014, Bonehill-Paine was sentenced to 180 hours of unpaid work and two years supervision for malicious communications over this incident. A year later, for breaching this community order, magistrates added another 10 hours of unpaid work to the sentence.

In February 2014, a hoax story about a six-year-old girl from Croydon being kidnapped by an Asian child grooming gang was shared on social media. A September 2014 story made false claims about an Asian youth punching a baby and throwing it against a wall, which Bonehill-Paine later said had been written by an English Defence League member and published "without researching the actual article first". The next month, Bonehill-Paine's blog spread a hoax that a Somali immigrant with Ebola had gone missing in Leicester. A fake NHS poster making this claim was publicised by Bonehill-Paine's website, reportedly distributed by one of his supporters in Leicester, and seen in a medical centre in the city.

In October 2014, he pleaded guilty to charges of malicious communications and harassment relating to articles on his Daily Bale blog falsely claiming that innocent people were paedophiles, drug dealers or religious zealots. During one hearing, he took issue with being called an "Internet troll" by the prosecutor, Dafydd Paxton. Sentencing was postponed until 12 January 2015 due to other "very serious" investigations involving him, including alleged incitement to racial hatred against a Member of Parliament, and later postponed again until 5 February. The hearing eventually took place on 9 February 2015, when he was given a three-month prison sentence suspended for 18 months, in addition to 80 hours' unpaid work and ten sessions of "education, training and employment". He was ordered to pay £85 costs and a victim surcharge of £80.

Public order offences and tweets to Jack Monroe
In February 2015, Bonehill-Paine was due to be charged in St Albans under s.38 of the Public Order Act 1986, the "contamination of goods", for publishing an article on his website suggesting that fruit and vegetables from Tesco were infected with Ebola. The offence carries a maximum 10-year sentence. In October 2015, he was tried at Stevenage Magistrates' Court for "misusing a public computer network to propagate grossly offensive, indecent, obscene or menacing material" in two online articles, one being the Tesco Ebola hoax and the other encouraging the immediate killing of disabled babies for the purpose of eugenics. The district judge cleared him of both charges citing the freedom of speech guaranteed by the Human Rights Act.

In April 2015, Bonehill-Paine claimed to have been the man arrested and released on bail on suspicion of sending "hate" tweets to Jack Monroe, a Guardian columnist. The tweets were made by a hoax account purporting to be from a former UKIP candidate, and UKIP reported the account to the police. In a statement on his website, Bonehill-Paine did not admit responsibility, but said that the tweets were "of a comical nature and [I] commend the level of free speech used".

In May 2015, Bonehill-Paine pleaded not guilty to a charge of harassment after it was alleged that he had left a swastika in the home of a Hertfordshire woman with whom he had spent two nights, describing it as a gift that had been touched by Adolf Hitler, before sending her a string of abusive messages and letters and asking her to become "his Eva". The case was adjourned until 15 July.

Antisemitic protests 
In January 2015, Bonehill-Paine called for a "mass protest" in March that year against what he perceived as the "complete Jewification" of Stamford Hill in north London, an area with the UK's largest ultra-orthodox Charedi population, with particular focus on the volunteer neighbourhood watch group, Shomrim, which he falsely asserts is an illegal religious police force. The Community Security Trust (CST) was in talks with local police, and local Jewish leaders were described as calm about the threat. Dave Rich, a CST spokesman said that Bonehill-Paine had "a long record of racist provocation and antisemitic abuse but he doesn't have much record of being able to mobilise large numbers of people on the street". Bonehill-Paine's protest was later cancelled due to lack of support.

In February 2015, Bonehill-Paine was arrested by police officers investigating allegations of inciting racial hatred relating to "two visual and written publications on the internet", and released on bail. He was arrested on suspicion of "racially aggravated harassment and malicious communications".

In June 2015, Bonehill-Paine announced his intention to join a New Dawn Party demonstration in Golders Green, an area of north London with a large Jewish minority, on Saturday 4 July 2015. Bonehell stated his intention to destroy Israeli flags by hand and tread upon them (believing that by not burning the flags he could "avoid prosecution") and said he would be burning copies of the Talmud, a Jewish holy book, in a "private ceremony". Posts to Bonehill-Paine's website featured Auschwitz-Birkenau imagery and said that the demonstration would be an "absolute gas". On 25 June, he was arrested by the Metropolitan Police and charged with inciting racial hatred contrary to the Public Order Act 1986. Four days later, he was remanded in custody at Westminster Magistrates' Court. He was refused bail at a Southwark Crown Court hearing on 13 July. At the next hearing on 21 September, he pleaded "absolutely not guilty" and was again remanded in custody.

The trial began at Southwark Crown Court on 14 December 2015. Mark Weekes for the prosecution described a poster on Bonehill-Paine's website which he invited visitors to print off to publicise the intended march on 4 July. The poster included an image of Auschwitz and a stereotyped cartoon of a Jewish man being sprayed with weedkiller, under the slogan "Join us on July 4 for what promises to be an absolute gas!" with an SS lightning bolt in the ‘O’ of Golders Green. Weekes said the poster "trivialises and mocks the death of millions of Jews during the Third Reich" and considered the use of Nazi imagery in reference to an area with a large Jewish population to be "incitement". On 16 December, Bonehill-Paine was convicted of inciting racial hatred against Jews. He was sentenced to three years and four months imprisonment.

Bonehill-Paine was held at HM Prison Manchester and HM Prison Wandsworth. In January 2016, he was investigated by the Prison Service for letters to fans, inside envelopes with drawings of Hitler, the September 11 attacks and Harold Shipman. In the letters, he mocked taxpayers for the £120,000 costs of holding him in prison and spoke of plans to stand for election as a member of parliament in Bradford when eligible five years after his release. The Appeal Court upheld the length of Bonehill-Paine's sentence in May 2016. He also spoke of a desire to run for MP of Yeovil, his home constituency, in order to build a "rural utopia" that would "ignite the fire" to spread throughout the country.

Harassment of Luciana Berger
In October 2014, Bonehill-Paine was investigated by police over antisemitic comments about the Labour MP Luciana Berger published on his website, after Garron Helm, a member of National Action, was imprisoned for sending antisemitic messages to her.

On 15 February 2015, it was reported that Bonehill-Paine had been arrested on suspicion of having sent antisemitic tweets to Berger. On 14 June 2016, he was charged with the racially or religiously aggravated harassment of  Berger between October 2014 and February 2015. At a hearing at the Old Bailey on 19 July 2016, with Bonehill-Paine participating via a video link, he was sent for trial.

The trial began on 5 December 2016. The court was told that Bonehill-Paine had posted five "hateful and insulting" articles about the woman he blamed for the jailing of a far-right extremist he regarded as a comrade. His defence counsel said Bonehill-Paine would not be giving evidence at the trial, but asserted that the defendant in posting his "pathetic, puerile rubbish" was, however, living in a country "where everyone is entitled to a voice".

On 7 December 2016, Bonehill-Paine was convicted of racially-aggravated harassment. The following day, he was imprisoned for two years, this new custodial term to be added to the existing sentence. A criminal behaviour order was imposed to restrict his internet use after his eventual release, including the barring of any attempt to contact Berger and other listed individuals, and the police were authorised to monitor his online activities for five years.

References

1992 births
Living people
21st-century English criminals
Alt-right politicians in the United Kingdom
British Holocaust deniers
British people convicted of burglary
Criminals from Somerset
Conservative Party (UK) people
English bloggers
English people convicted of assault
English fascists
English neo-Nazis
British National Party people
People from Yeovil
Antisemitism in the United Kingdom
People convicted of harassment
People convicted of racial hatred offences
Prisoners and detainees of England and Wales
British people convicted of hate crimes
Antisemitism in England
Internet trolls
British male bloggers